The IWGP Heavyweight Championship was New Japan Pro-Wrestling's top championship from 1987–2021

IWGP Heavyweight Championship may also refer to:
 IWGP Heavyweight Championship (original version), New Japan Pro-Wrestling's top championship from 1983–1987
 IWGP Heavyweight Championship (IGF), Inoki Genome Federation's top championship from 2007–2008
 IWGP World Heavyweight Championship, New Japan Pro-Wrestling's current top championship